Michael J. "Mike" Brown (born March 11, 1941) is a former American politician and appraiser.

Born in Woodstock, Illinois, Brown received his bachelor's degree from Illinois Institute of Technology. He also studied at Northwestern University and McHenry County College. He was an appraiser and lived in Crystal Lake, Illinois. On July 28, 1997, Brown was appointed to the Illinois House of Representatives and served until 1999. Brown was a Republican.

Notes

1941 births
Living people
People from Crystal Lake, Illinois
People from Woodstock, Illinois
Illinois Institute of Technology alumni
Northwestern University alumni
Businesspeople from Illinois
Republican Party members of the Illinois House of Representatives